Wolfgang Leidhold (born 12 December 1950 in Dortmund) is a German political scientist, philosopher and artist.

Career
Leidhold studied social sciences, philosophy and East Asian studies at the Ruhr University Bochum. His teachers included Norbert Elias, Günter Gawlick, Jürgen Gebhardt, Leo Kofler, Eric Voegelin and Peter Weber-Schäfer. After his graduate degree with a thesis on René Descartes (unpublished) and studies at the Stanford University, CA, he received his doctorate in 1982 with a work on “Ethics and Politics in Francis Hutcheson’s works”. From 1978 to 1992 he was Assistant at the University Erlangen. During the 1990s his research focused on International Relations, especially in cooperation with the German Institute for International and Security Affairs (SWP). Several research stays in the USA followed, among others at the Georgetown University and the University of Hawaii as well as in New Zealand, Australia and the South Pacific. Leidhold’s habilitation for the political sciences followed in 1989 with a thesis on “Security Policy related Problems in the Pacific Island Region” (1991). After lectureships at the Ludwig Maximilian University of Munich and the Catholic University of Eichstätt-Ingolstadt he accepted a professorship at the University of Cologne in 1992. In 1997 Wolfgang Leidhold initiated and organized a prototype of ILIAS, the first Learning Management System, within the VIRTUS project at the Faculty of Management, Economics and Social Sciences of the University of Cologne. His dedication to the project was rewarded with the ILIAS speedwell in 2015. In 2001 Leidhold was awarded the Karl-Carstens-Preis for his remarkable accomplishments in giving a predominately young audience an understanding of the complex connections in modern security policy by means of an interactive simulation.

Artistic activity
From 1972 to 1975 Leidhold completed his artistic training under the supervision of painter Hans-Jürgen Schlieker. After group exhibitions in Bochum and his move to the University of Erlangen he continued his artistic engagement in Eberhard “Pinsl” Königsreuther’s Studio. In his painting he developed a trans-historic metaphysic realism that combines artistic techniques, way of composition and coloring of the Renaissance with contemporary abstract formulations, whereby he picks up classical Themes in particular. His work was inspired by Duccio and Lorenzo Monaco as well as by Michelangelo and Raffael. In the modern era besides Carlo Carrà, Giorgio de Chirico, Max Ernst and Willi Baumeister also Dubuffet and Cy Twombly played a role in Leidhold’s occupation with their mythological and metaphysical Themes.

In addition, he assists the New York based Boris Lurie Art Foundation as a consultant in promoting the Jewish artist Boris Lurie. He initiated and coordinated two solo exhibitions of Boris Lurie's artwork and heritage at the NS-Documentation Center in Cologne (2014) and the Jewish Museum in Berlin (2016).

Theory

Experience
The plural term of experience and the criticism of the empiricism play a crucial role in Leidhold’s works. In his book “Political Philosophy” Leidhold defines experience as “conscious reference” of something that is experienced to the experiencing subject and on this basis identifies five experiential dimensions: the experience of the senses, the imagination, the self-consciousness, the religious experience and the “speculative experience” or the power to reason. Because the structure of experience is not a culture-specific but universal phenomenon, Leidhold’s understanding of experience forms the foundation for an intercultural Hermeneutic.

Religious experience and absent presence
The distinctive feature of the religious experience according to Leidhold lies in its active reference through an “absent presence” as opposed to the experiencing subject. The “absent presence”, after Leidhold, is the source that refers to the Human (“Presence”) without itself entering the horizon of the reference (“absence”).

Noetic turn
By means of the criterion whether the particular structure of religious experience becomes transparent or not Leidhold distinguishes between the non-articulated and the articulated type of religious consciousness. As examples for the first type he names the cosmological myth of the ancient Egyptians or Sumerians, as examples for the second type he mentions religions that refer back to reputable originators, such as Zarathustra, Moses, Laozi or Buddha. The transition from the non-articulated type to the articulated type Leidhold terms the noetic turn. He demonstrates this phenomenon by means of extensive material in the field of history of ideas.

Empiric metaphysics
Counter to Wolff’s and Kant’s thesis that metaphysics are founded on the basis of pure reason, Leidhold develops empirically consolidated metaphysics. Simultaneously he carries out a radical change away from classical philosophy of being by considering time instead of being the highest concept.

Person and ensemble
Leidhold distinguishes in his view of the human between the fixed biological foundation (“hominity”) and the open existence as a person (“humanity”). Due to the existence of man as a person that always stands in a communicative relation with others, the specific human type of cohabitation, according to Leidhold, is not the herd but the “ensemble”. This signifies the consciously formed, joint order, whose earliest type already occurs in the horde and develops its paradigmatic shape in the Greek polis.

History of Experience
In his current project on the history of experience, Leidhold examines both the structure of experience and how it has evolved from the Palaeolithic to the present, as well as its effects on the dynamics of cultures and political orders. His main thesis advocates a paradigm shift: the structure of experience changes in the course of human history. This thesis runs against the general consensus that regards the architecture of experience as a universal constant. In contrast, Leidhold identifies eight transformations of experiential structure (including the discovery of imagination and contemplation, of spiritual experience and the unconscious) that have developed in different regions at different times. He shows how the particular mix of experiential structures determines both the characteristics of cultures and their respective design of political order. This "history of experience" includes both an interdisciplinary theory of experience that combines neurological, philosophical-systematic and historical aspects—as well as a detailed intercultural analysis of historical material from the Palaeolithic up to the present.

Other activities
 1981-1983: Development of the simulation games SINTAKTIKON and POL&IS
 1986-1996: Founding and management of the “Researchgroup Simulations – FOGS e.V.” (together with Claudia Floritz, Jörg Hahn, Thomas Sommer and Wolfgang Zauner)
 1997-2001: Initiator and spokesperson of the project “Virtual Universitysystems – VIRTUS”, sponsored by the foundations Bertelsmann and Nixdorf, as well as supported by the Land NRW and private sponsors
 Since 1997: Development of the online platform for teaching and scientific working “ILIAS”
 1998-2000: Member of the “Body of Experts for the Development of Higher Education with New Media” of the Bertelsmann Foundation
 1999-2000: Advisory activity for the expert board for the evaluation of the universities of North Rhine-Westphalia 
 2001-2004: Initiator and consortium leader of the statewide project “Political Sciences Online – POLITIKON” in cooperation with the German Association for Political Sciences
 2001-2005: Member of the commission “New Media and Transfer of Knowledge” of the conference of university rectors. 
 2001-2008: Head of several projects like JOIN!, SHARE, OpenDock, BAZAAR, evoLearn, funded by the European Community 
 2007-2011: Head or participant of several projects like Biotechnologie im Wertewandel (Diskurs ELSA), Unirep-Online, Demo-Credit (XENOS-Projektreihe), funded by the federal government 
 Since 2011: Initiator and head of the cooperation network Global Theory Network 
 Since 2013: Head of the project Modern Art and the Political Discourse in cooperation with Boris Lurie Art Foundation, New York

Literature
 Gottes Gegenwart, Zur Logik der religiösen Erfahrung, Darmstadt 2008, 
 Francis Hutcheson, An Inquiry into the Original of Our Ideas of Beauty and Virtue in two treatises, ed. and introd. by Wolfgang Leidhold, 2. rev. ed., Indianapolis, In. 2008, 
 Demokratie – Chancen und Herausforderungen im 21. Jahrhundert, Wolfgang Leidhold, André Kaiser (Hrsg.), Münster (u. a.) 2005, 
 Politische Philosophie, 2. verb. Aufl., Würzburg 2003, 
 Krise unter dem Kreuz des Südens, Die Pazifische Inselregion und die internationale Sicherheit, Internationale Politik und Sicherheit, Bd. 27, Baden-Baden 1991, 
 Ethik und Politik bei Francis Hutcheson, Praktische Philosophie, Bd. 21, Freiburg 1985,

Papers and contributions
 History and Experience, in: S. Fink, R. Rollinger, Hg., Oswald Spenglers Kulturmorphologie, Eine multiperspektivische Annäherung, Wiesbaden 2018, pp. 489–521.
 Architektur als symbolische Form, in: (Un)Möglich! – Künstler als Architekten, Herford 2015, pp. 76–77.
 Wege und Abwege in die transparente Gesellschaft, Von der Geschichte und Gegenwart der digitalen Kultur, in: Die politische Meinung, Sankt Augustin 2014 (526), pp. 12–18:
 Towards a History of Experience, the Changing Structure of Conscious Participation, APSA 2012.
 The Noetic Turn: from Zarathustra to the Wisdom of Salomon, APSA 2011. 
 Demokratie, Religion, Erfahrung, in: Elke-Vera Kotowski, Reinhard Sonnenschmidt (Hg.), Grenzgänge zwischen Politik und Religion, München 2009, pp. 13–32.
 Alles fließt, Zur Metaphysik des Werdens, Heraklit versus Parmenides, in: Jörg Martin (Hrsg.), Welt im Fluss, Fallstudien zum Modell der Homöostase, Stuttgart 2008, S. 43-56.
 Wahrheit und Entscheidung, in: Petra Huse, Ingmar Dette (Hrsg.), Abenteuer des Geistes – Dimensionen des Politischen, Festschrift für Walter Rotholz, Baden-Baden 2008, S. 303-311.
 Rationality – What Else? in: Marcel van Ackeren, Orrin Finn Summerrell (eds.), The Political Identity of the West, Platonism in the Dialogue of Cultures, Frankfurt am Main (u. a.) 2006, S. 189-199.
 Vernunft, Erfahrung, Religion, Anmerkungen zu John Lockes’ Reasonableness of Christianity, in: Lothar Kreimendahl (Hrsg.), Aufklärung, Interdisziplinäres Jahrbuch zur Erforschung des 18. Jahrhunderts und seiner Wirkungsgeschichte Band 18, Hamburg 2006, S. 159-178.
 Mythos und Logos, in: Marcel van Ackeren, Jörn Müller (Hrsg.), Antike Philosophie verstehen, Understanding Ancient Philosophy, Darmstadt 2006, S. 72-86.
 Aristoteles (384-322 v. Chr.), in: Wilhelm Bleek, Hans J. Lietzmann (Hrsg.), Klassiker der Politikwissenschaft, Von Aristoteles bis David Easton, München 2005, S. 19-32.
 John Balguy, in: Helmut Holzhey, Vilem Mudroch (Hrsg.), Großbritannien, Nordamerika, Niederlande, Die Philosophie des 18. Jahrhunderts, Bd. 1, Basel 2004, S. 142-144.
 Joseph Butler, in: Helmut Holzhey, Vilem Mudroch (Hrsg.), Großbritannien, Nordamerika, Niederlande, Die Philosophie des 18. Jahrhunderts, Bd. 1, Basel 2004, S. 153-163.
 Gerschom Carmichael, in: Helmut Holzhey, Vilem Mudroch (Hrsg.), Großbritannien, Nordamerika, Niederlande, Die Philosophie des 18. Jahrhunderts, Bd. 1, Basel 2004, S. 139-142.
 Francis Hutcheson, in: Helmut Holzhey, Vilem Mudroch (Hrsg.), Großbritannien, Nordamerika, Niederlande, Die Philosophie des 18. Jahrhunderts, Bd. 1, Basel 2004, S. 125-139.
 William Leechman, in: Helmut Holzhey, Vilem Mudroch (Hrsg.), Großbritannien, Nordamerika, Niederlande, Die Philosophie des 18. Jahrhunderts, Bd. 1, Basel 2004, S. 150-153.
 John Taylor, in: Helmut Holzhey, Vilem Mudroch (Hrsg.), Großbritannien, Nordamerika, Niederlande, Die Philosophie des 18. Jahrhunderts, Bd. 1, Basel 2004, S. 144-146.
 George Turnbull, in: Helmut Holzhey, Vilem Mudroch (Hrsg.), Großbritannien, Nordamerika, Niederlande, Die Philosophie des 18. Jahrhunderts, Bd. 1, Basel 2004, S. 146-150.
 Wissensgesellschaft, in: Karl-Rudolf Korte, Werner Weidenfeld (Hrsg.), Deutschland-TrendBuch, Fakten und Orientierungen, Opladen 2001, S. 429-460.
 Das kreative Projekt, Genealogie und Begriff, in: Harald Bluhm, Jürgen Gebhardt (Hrsg.), Konzepte politischen Handelns, Kreativität - Innovation – Praxen, Baden-Baden 2001, S. 51-72.
 Über die Zeit, in: Andreas Pigulla, Christine Moll-Murata, Iris Hasselberg (Hrsg.), Ostasien verstehen, Peter Weber-Schäfer zu Ehren, Festschrift aus Anlaß seiner Emeritierung, München 2000, S. 201-216.
 Aristoteles, Politikwissenschaft und praktische Philosophie, in: Wolfgang Leidhold (Hrsg.), Politik und Politeia, Formen und Probleme politischer Ordnung, Festgabe für Jürgen Gebhardt zum 65. Geburtstag, Würzburg 2000, S. 423-444.
 Francis Hutcheson, in: Lothar Kreimendahl (Hrsg.), Philosophen des 18. Jahrhunderts, eine Einführung, Darmstadt 2000, S. 87-103.
 Tendenzen und Konzepte einer neuen Weltordnung – über Prinzipien und Komponenten globaler Ordnungsmodell, in: Politisches Denken, Jahrbuch 1997, Stuttgart (u. a.) 1997, S. 75-100.
 Die Neuentdeckung der Alten Welt, Machiavelli und die Analyse der internationalen Beziehungen, in: Der Staat 2 (1992), S. 187-204.
 Das amerikanische Parteiensystem zwischen Erosion und Erneuerung, Von der „Krise der amerikanischen Parteien“ zur Service-Partei, in: Zeitschrift für Politik 37 (1990), S. 361-374.
 Eric Voegelin, zus. mit Jürgen Gebhardt, in: Karl Graf Ballestrem u. Henning Ottmann (Hrsg.), Politische Philosophie des 20. Jahrhunderts, Oldenbourg 1990, S. 123-145.
 Historiengenesis – Politogenese, Zur Analyse von Entstehung, Ordnung und Selbst-interpretation politischer Ensemble, in: Peter Hampe (Bearb.), Symbol- und Ordnungsformen im Zivilisationsvergleich, Wissenschaftliches Symposion in Memoriam Eric Voegelin, Tutzing 1990, S. 59-92.

References

External links

 Prof. Dr. Wolfgang Leidhold - Forschungsinstitut für Politische Wissenschaft und Europäische Fragen
 ILIAS open source
 Author Website
 Art Website

1950 births
Living people
German male artists
German philosophers
German political scientists
Ruhr University Bochum alumni
Stanford University alumni
Academic staff of the University of Erlangen-Nuremberg